This is a list of federally recognized Native American Tribes in the U.S. state of Oklahoma. With its 38 federally recognized tribes, Oklahoma has the third largest numbers of tribes of any state, behind Alaska and California.

Native American-related lists

See also 
Oklahoma Tribal Statistical Area
Former Indian reservations in Oklahoma

Notes

References 

 
Native American-related lists
Oklahoma-related lists